Strandietta is a genus of beetles in the family Buprestidae, the jewel beetles. They are native to the Afrotropical realm.

Species include:

Species
 Strandietta austroafricana Bellamy, 2008
 Strandietta jakobsoni Obenberger, 1931
 Strandietta maynei (Kerremans, 1914)
 Strandietta nodosa (Kerremans, 1914)
 Strandietta schoutedeni Obenberger, 1931

References

Buprestidae genera
Beetles of Africa